This is a list of members of the 7th Legislative Assembly of Queensland from 1873 to 1878, as elected at the 1873 colonial elections held between 4 November 1873 and 4 December 1873 (due to problems of distance and communications, it was not possible to hold the elections on a single day).

See also
Premier:
 Arthur Hunter Palmer (1870–1874)
 Arthur Macalister (1874–1876)
 George Thorn (1876–1877)
 John Douglas (1877–1879)

Notes
 On 8 January 1874, Ratcliffe Pring, member for Carnarvon, was appointed to the Macalister Ministry as Attorney-General. He therefore was required to resign his seat and stand for a ministerial by-election. He lost the seat to William Miles at the resulting by-election on 20 January 1874.
 On 8 January 1874, George Thorn, member for Fassifern, was appointed to the Queensland Legislative Council. His brother John Thorn won the resulting by-election on 24 January 1874.
 On 14 February 1874, Charles Lilley, member for Fortitude Valley, resigned. Frank Beattie won the resulting by-election on 25 February 1874.
 The election of Adam Walker, the member for Balonne, was voided on 27 May 1874, and Jacob Low was appointed in his place.
 The election of Philip Nind, the member for Logan, was voided on 27 May 1874. He retained his seat at the resulting by-election on 8 June 1874.
 On 13 November 1874, Edward MacDevitt, member for Ravenswood, resigned. Henry Edward King won the resulting by-election on 9 December 1874.
 On 1 February 1875, Edward Wienholt, member for Darling Downs, resigned. William Graham won the resulting by-election on 23 March 1875.
 On 16 March 1875, Berkeley Basil Moreton, member for Maryborough, resigned. John Douglas won the resulting by-election on 2 April 1875.
 On 3 April 1875, Philip Nind, member for Logan, resigned. Adam Black won the resulting by-election on 16 April 1875.
 On 5 May 1875, Thomas Henry FitzGerald, member for Bowen, resigned. Francis Amhurst won the resulting by-election on 14 May 1975.
 On 13 May 1875, Thomas Blacket Stephens, member for South Brisbane, resigned. Richard Ash Kingsford won the resulting by-election on 26 May 1875, defeating the other nominee Ratcliffe Pring.
 On 3 October 1875, Adam Black, member for Logan, resigned. Frederick Shaw won the resulting by-election on 19 October 1875.
 On 13 September 1875, William Hodgkinson, member for Burke, resigned. James Augustus Parker won the resulting by-election on 26 October 1875.
 On 14 October 1875, William Miles, member for Carnarvon, resigned. John Tyrel won the resulting by-election on 8 January 1876.
 On 8 December 1875, Edmund Royds, member for Leichhardt, resigned. Charles Haly won the resulting by-election on 12 January 1876.
 On 4 January 1876, Charles Graham, member for Clermont, resigned. John Stevenson won the resulting by-election on 4 February 1876.
 On 12 April 1876, Frederick Shaw, member for Logan, resigned. Peter McLean won the resulting by-election on 9 May 1876.
 The Additional Members Act 1875 created the new seat of Cook. On 1 June 1876, William Edward Murphy became its first member at a special election.
 On 14 June 1876, Arthur Macalister, member for Ipswich, resigned. George Thorn won the resulting by-election on 20 June 1876.
 On 26 June 1876, William Hemmant, member for Bulimba, resigned. James Johnston won the resulting by-election on 7 July 1876.
 On 21 June 1876, James Augustus Parker, member for Burke, resigned. Patrick O'Sullivan won the resulting by-election on 22 August 1876.
 On 30 October 1876, Henry Thorn, member for Northern Downs, resigned. William Miles won the resulting by-election on 14 November 1876.
 On 7 November 1876, James Johnston, member for Bulimba, died. George Grimes won the resulting by-election on 18 November 1876.
 On 9 March 1877, Robert Lord, member for Gympie, resigned. James Kidgell won the resulting by-election on 23 March 1877.
 On 20 March 1877, Oscar de Satge, member for Normanby, resigned. George Fox won the resulting by-election on 19 April 1877.
 On 24 March 1877, Francis Amhurst, member for Bowen, resigned. Henry Beor won the resulting by-election on 23 April 1877.
 On 9 April 1877, Edward Wilmot Pechey, member for Aubigny, resigned. Patrick Perkins won the resulting by-election on 1 May 1877.
 On 24 April 1877, William Fryar, member for East Moreton, resigned. James Garrick won the resulting by-election on 10 May 1877.
 On 28 April 1877, George Edmondstone, member for Wickham, resigned. Albert John Hockings won the resulting by-election on 12 May 1877.
 On 26 October 1877, Charles Hardie Buzacott, member for Rockhampton, resigned. John MacFarlane won the resulting by-election on 20 November 1877.
 On 1 February 1878, Robert Stewart, member for Brisbane City, resigned. Ratcliffe Pring won the resulting by-election on 12 February 1878.
 On 12 February 1878, George Thorn, member for Ipswich, resigned. John MacFarlane won the resulting by-election on 7 March 1878.
 On 12 March 1878, John Thorn, member for Fassifern, resigned. de Burgh Fitzpatrick Persse won the resulting by-election on 9 April 1878.

References

 Waterson, Duncan Bruce: Biographical Register of the Queensland Parliament 1860-1929 (second edition), Sydney 2001.
 Alphabetical Register of Members (Queensland Parliament)
 Brisbane Courier variously over 1873–1878

Members of Queensland parliaments by term
19th-century Australian politicians